Vee Beyvafa is a 2016 Maldivian romantic film directed by Ibrahim Wisan. Produced by Ahmed Shah and Hussain Munawwar under Sunshine Production, the film stars Niuma Mohamed, Yoosuf Shafeeu, Zeenath Abbas, Abdulla Muaz and Fathimath Fareela in pivotal roles. The film was released on 18 October 2016.

Cast 
 Niuma Mohamed as Riyasha
 Yoosuf Shafeeu as Hassan Ziyad
 Zeenath Abbas as Shiuna
 Abdulla Muaz as Huzam
 Fathimath Fareela as Nisha
 Ajnaaz Ali as Faruhad

Soundtrack

Release
The film was released on 30 November 2016, five years after commencing pre-production. Upon release, the film received a negative response from critics. Ahmed Adhushan of Mihaaru concluded his review calling the film "a step backward" in the progress of cinema. He further criticised the screenplay by Zareer and Ahmed, and blamed its weak writing for the lack of character development.

Accolades

References

2016 films
2016 romance films
Maldivian romance films
Films directed by Ibrahim Wisan